The One is the third studio album and second English-language album by Frankie J. It was released on March 22, 2005 and debuted at #3 on the Billboard 200 with over 130,000 copies sold in its first week released and was certified platinum by the RIAA for shipping over a million copies. The album's first single, "Obsession (No Es Amor)" had been receiving heavy rotation on radio stations, reaching #3 on the Billboard Hot 100.

On October 11, 2005, The One saw a re-release in a dual disc format which included a cover single of the song "More Than Words" by Extreme, with the DVD portion offering the whole album in enhanced stereo quality sound. The "More Than Words" music video (in both English and Spanish) came with a behind-the-scenes look with Frankie J, titled "Along For the Ride".

Critical reception

AllMusic editor Andy Kellman remarked that on The One, Frankie J "continues to work closely with Happy Perez, but Cox's presence on not one but three tracks [...] adds significant heft to his catalog [...] The One is a step forward in every aspect. Lead single "Obsession (No Es Amor)" shot up to the Top Ten upon release, only solidifying J's mainstream presence."

Track listing

Notes
 signifies co-producer(s)
 signifies additional producer(s)
Sample credits
"Story of My Life" samples "Everything She Wants" by Wham!.

Charts

Weekly charts

Year-end charts

Certifications

References

2005 albums
Frankie J albums
Albums produced by Bryan-Michael Cox
Albums produced by Happy Perez
Albums produced by Irv Gotti
Columbia Records albums
Albums produced by Luny Tunes